Henry Borges (born 30 April 1983) is a blind Uruguayan Paralympic judoka who competes in international level events. He was the first Uruguayan Paralympic competitor to participate in three Paralympic Games, his highest achievement was reaching the bronze medal match at 2016 Summer Paralympics and lost to Alex Bologa.

References

1983 births
Living people
People from Artigas, Uruguay
Paralympic judoka of Uruguay
Judoka at the 2004 Summer Paralympics
Judoka at the 2008 Summer Paralympics
Judoka at the 2016 Summer Paralympics
Medalists at the 2007 Parapan American Games
Medalists at the 2015 Parapan American Games
Medalists at the 2019 Parapan American Games
Uruguayan male judoka